Millo (possibly from Aymara for a kind of salpeter / light brown, reddish, fair-haired, dark chestnut, Quechua for salty,) is a mountain in the Vilcanota mountain range in the Andes of Peru, about  high. It is situated in the Cusco Region, Canchis Province, Checacupe District, and in the Puno Region, Carabaya Province, Corani District. Millo lies northwest of the large glaciated area of Quelccaya (Quechua for "snow plain") and west of Unollocsina.

References 

Mountains of Peru
Mountains of Cusco Region
Mountains of Puno Region
Glaciers of Peru